"(Your Love Keeps Lifting Me) Higher and Higher" is an R&B song written by Gary Jackson, Raynard Miner, and Carl Smith. It was recorded by Jackie Wilson for his album 
Higher and Higher (1967),  produced by Carl Davis, and became a Top 10 pop and number one R&B hit.

Overview

The backing track was recorded on July 6, 1967 at Columbia's studios in Chicago. Produced by Carl Davis, the session, arranged by Sonny Sanders, featured bassist James Jamerson, drummer Richard "Pistol" Allen, guitarist Robert White, and keyboardist Johnny Griffith; these four musicians were all members of the Motown Records house band The Funk Brothers who often moonlighted on sessions for Davis to augment the wages paid by Motown.

According to Carl Davis, the Funk Brothers "used to come over on the weekends from Detroit. They'd load up in the van and come over to Chicago, and I would pay 'em double scale, and I'd pay 'em in cash." Similarly, two members of Motown's house session singers The Andantes, Jackie Hicks and Marlene Barrow, along with Pat Lewis (who was filling in for Andantes member Louvain Demps), performed on the session for "Higher and Higher". 
Drummer Maurice White (better known as a singer for Earth, Wind & Fire) also played on the recording. Motown's Mike Terry played the baritone saxophone.

The song was originally written by Chess Records' in-house writers and producers Carl Smith and Raynard Miner, and initially recorded by The Dells for the label, but not released. Another writer, Gary Jackson, made some changes to the song and pitched it to Davis at Brunswick. When the singer recorded his vocal track, Davis recalls, Wilson originally sang the song "like a soul ballad. I said that's totally wrong. You have to jump and go with the percussion... If he didn't want to sing it that way, I would put my voice on the record and sell millions." After hearing Davis's advice, Wilson cut the lead vocal for "Higher and Higher" in a single take.

A publishing deal for the song was reached with Brunswick after Chess producer/A&R head, Billy Davis intervened. Writing credits were agreed with Smith, Miner, Jackson and Billy Davis all named. Later, Davis removed his credit and BMI now lists the song as by the three other writers. The Dells' version appeared on their album, "There Is" for Chess subsidiary, Cadet the same year.

Release
Released in August 1967, the song reached number one on the US Billboard R&B chart and, in November, peaked on the Billboard Hot 100 at No. 6. Wilson's version also rose to number 11 and 15 upon the UK Singles Chart during 1969 and 1987 respectively.

Brunswick Records then released an album titled Higher and Higher in November 1967. Its chart peak was No. 163 (Billboard 200) and No. 28 (Billboard R&B Albums chart.)

The track was ranked No. 246 on Rolling Stone's list of The 500 Greatest Songs of All Time, and was inducted into the Grammy Hall of Fame in 1999.

Charts

Weekly charts

Year-end charts

Certifications

Rita Coolidge version

Rita Coolidge remade the song as "(Your Love Has Lifted Me) Higher and Higher" for her album Anytime...Anywhere (1977). Her version has a more moderate tempo than that of the uptempo original, and largely omits the chorus which is evidenced only in the background vocals sung under the repetition of the first verse with which she closes the song. Coolidge and her sister Priscilla Coolidge had sung background on a version of the song for a prospective album by Priscilla's husband Booker T. Jones; when that album was shelved, Coolidge asked him if she could cut the song using his arrangement.

Released as a single, Coolidge's version became her first major hit in nine years of recording: the track peaked at No. 2 on the Billboard Hot 100. It was kept from the No. 1 spot by "Best of My Love" by The Emotions.Cash Box ranked it at No. 1. "Higher and Higher" also reached No. 1 in Canada. Both the song and a subsequent release, "We're All Alone", earned Coolidge gold records for each selling a million copies.

In the UK it was released as the follow-up single after "We're All Alone" which had reached No. 6, but it only achieved a peak of No. 48 there.

Chart performance

Weekly charts

Year-end charts

Kevin Borg version
In 2008, Kevin Borg performed the song, still known as "Higher and Higher", and became the winner of season eight of Idol. The version charted in Sweden, peaking at number twenty-nine.

See also
 List of Cash Box Top 100 number-one singles of 1977

References

External links
 Lyrics of this song

1967 singles
2007 singles
1977 singles
Jackie Wilson songs
Otis Redding songs
Rita Coolidge songs
Bette Midler songs
Cashbox number-one singles
RPM Top Singles number-one singles
The Flying Pickets songs
1967 songs
Brunswick Records singles
A&M Records singles
Northern soul songs